Brecon Beacons may refer to:
Brecon Beacons, a mountain range located in the south-east of Wales
Brecon Beacons National Park, a National Park covering large areas of South Wales
"Brecon Beacons," a song by Supergrass from their 2002 album Life on Other Planets